Matthew Boldy (born April 5, 2001) is an American professional ice hockey forward who is currently playing with the Minnesota Wild of the National Hockey League (NHL). He was drafted 12th overall by the Wild in the first round of the 2019 NHL Entry Draft.

Early life
Boldy was born on April 5, 2001, to parents Todd Boldy and Jennifer Gruttadauria. His father, Todd, was a football player at the University of Maine and currently serves as a member of the Attleboro Police Department. He was born in Millville, but his family moved to Millis when Boldy was in the fourth grade.

Growing up, Todd encouraged Matthew and his brother Michael to play hockey instead of football due to limited options in Millis, Massachusetts. Boldy attended Medway Public School and skated for the Dexter Southfield School before attending Northville High School alongside Team USA teammate Henry Thrun. In his first year at Dexter, Boldy accumulated 13 goals and 13 assists in 29 games under coach Dan Donato. As a result, he was invited to try out for the USA Hockey National Team Development Program (USNTDP) in the United States Hockey League (USHL).

Playing career
Boldy joined the USNTDP for the 2017–18 USHL season and led the team with 11 goals and four shorthanded goals in 13 games as a rookie. In his first year of draft eligibility, Boldy received an A rating on NHL Central Scouting Bureau's preliminary players to watch list. He returned to the USNTDP for his their 2018–19 season and recorded 33 goals and 48 assists for 81 points in 64 games. Upon signing his letter of intent at Boston College for the 2019–20 season, Boldy said "playing at BC was always a dream of mine...when I got the chance it was hard to pass up. I grew up going to their games and being around there. When I got the chance it was a pretty easy choice for me."

During the 2019 NHL Entry Draft, Boldy was selected 12th overall by the Minnesota Wild.

Collegiate
In his sophomore season with Boston College, he led the Eagles in scoring with 11 goals, 20 assists and 31 points in 22 games of the shortened 2020–21 season. Boldy was named a Hobey Baker Award Top Ten Finalist before opting to end his collegiate career. On March 31, 2021, Boldy was signed to a three-year, entry-level contract with the Wild and was assigned to their American Hockey League (AHL) affiliate, the Iowa Wild, for the remainder of the season.

Professional
On January 6, 2022, Boldy made his NHL debut, scoring the game-winning goal against the Boston Bruins in the Wild's 3–2 win.  On February 14, 2022, Boldy earned his first NHL hat trick against the Detroit Red Wings in the Minnesota Wild’s 7–4 win.  He finished his first season with the Wild with 15 goals and 24 assists in 47 games.

On January 16, 2023, the Wild signed Boldy to a seven-year, $49 million contract extension.

Career statistics

Regular season and playoffs

International

Awards and honors

References

External links
 

2001 births
Living people
AHCA Division I men's ice hockey All-Americans
American men's ice hockey centers
Boston College Eagles men's ice hockey players
Iowa Wild players
Minnesota Wild draft picks
Minnesota Wild players
National Hockey League first-round draft picks
People from Millis, Massachusetts
Ice hockey players from Massachusetts
USA Hockey National Team Development Program players